Axyris, the Russian pigweeds, are a genus of flowering plants in the amaranth family Amaranthaceae, native to temperate parts of Eastern Europe and Asia.  The center of genetic diversity is the Altai to northern Tien-Shan mountains. The best known species is Axyris amaranthoides, which has become a widespread invasive in northern North America.

Species
Currently accepted species include:

Axyris amaranthoides L.
Axyris caucasica (Sommier & Levier) Lipsky
Axyris hybrida L.
Axyris koreana Nakai
Axyris mira Sukhor.
Axyris prostrata L.
Axyris sphaerosperma Fisch. & C.A.Mey.

References 

Chenopodioideae
Amaranthaceae genera